Phytomyza ranunculi is a species of fly in the family Agromyzidae. It is found in the  Palearctic .

Life cycle

Eggs are laid on plants in the Ranunculaceae family. The larvae are, primarily, leaf-miners. They form a long, conspicuous white mine with the frass present in close strings.

In 2018 the first confirmed adults were reared from stem-mines of meadow buttercup (Ranunculus acris). This is a rare example of 'organoxeny', where a phytophagous insecy occurs on a different part of a plant from where it can normally be found .

The larvae pupates into a greyish or brown puparium, with posterior spiracles each with about 18-20 bulbs. Adult flies are approximately 2 mm in length. Adults are highly variable in colour, with several named variants including a pale form (P. ranunculi var. flava) and dark forms (P. ranunculi var. flavoscutellata and var. islandica).

Distribution
The fly is widespread throughout Europe.

Parasitoids
P. ranunculi pupae are particularly at risk from parasitism. Up to 75% of all reared puparium have been shown to be parasitised. Parasitoids of this species include numerous species in the hymenoptera superfamilies Chalcidoidea and Ichneumonoidea:

Chrysocharis idyia (Walker, 1839)	
Chrysocharis orbicularis (Nees, 1834)	
Chrysocharis pentheus (Walker, 1839)	
Chrysocharis pubicornis (Zetterstedt, 1838)	
Chrysocharis viridis (Nees, 1934)	
Pediobius metallicus (Nees, 1834)	
Cirrospilus vittatus Walker, 1838	
Diglyphus chabrias (Walker, 1838)	
Diglyphus isaea (Walker, 1838)	
Diglyphus minoeus (Walker, 1838)	
Diglyphus pusztensis (Erdös and Novicky, 1951)	
Hemiptarsenus ornatus (Nees, 1834)	
Hemiptarsenus unguicellus (Zetterstedt, 1838)	
Necremnus tidius (Walker, 1839)	
Pnigalio soemius (Walker, 1839)	
Miscogaster elegans Walker, 1833	
Miscogaster maculata Walker, 1833	
Stenomalina gracilis (Walker, 1934)	
Epiclerus panyas (Walker, 1839)	
Chorebus kama (Nixon, 1945)	
Coloneura stylata Förster, 1862	
Dacnusa areolaris (Nees, 1811)	
Dacnusa confinis Ruthe, 1859	
Dacnusa laeta (Nixon, 1954)	
Dacnusa laevipectus Thomson, 1895	
Dacnusa macrospila (Haliday, 1839)	
Dacnusa maculipes Thomson, 1895	
Dacnusa melicerta (Nixon, 1954)	
Dacnusa sibirica Telenga, 1935	
Dapsilarthra sylvia (Haliday, 1839)	
Exotela gilvipes (Haliday, 1839)	
Grammospila rufiventris (Nees, 1812)	
Colastes braconius Haliday, 1833	
Apodesmia posticatae (Fischer, 1957)	
Opius pallipes Wesmael, 1835	
Opius orbiculator (Nees, 1811)

References

Phytomyza
Insects described in 1803
Leaf miners
Muscomorph flies of Europe
Taxa named by Franz von Paula Schrank